Aphanopleura zangelanica, the Zangelanian aphanopleura, is a species in the family Apiaceae that is endemic to the Zəngilan district of Azerbaijan. It is only known from its type specimen collected in 1971.

References

Apioideae
Endemic flora of Azerbaijan
Plants described in 1975